This article lists every player to have competed in the World Snooker Championship (not including qualifiers) since 1969, when the championship reverted to a knockout format, following the title being decided in a series of challenge matches from 1964 to 1968.

Players
Best refers to each player's best finish.

Notes

References

players
World champions